Ibrahim Khan  is a Pakistani politician who had been a member of the National Assembly of Pakistan from August 2018 till January 2023.

Political career
He was elected to the National Assembly of Pakistan from Constituency NA-158 (Multan-V) as a candidate of Pakistan Tehreek-e-Insaf in 2018 Pakistani general election. Previously he remained member of Punjab provincial assembly from 2002 to 2008. He won as an independent candidate and later joined PML Q. He contested elections in 2008 and 2013 and each time was defeated due to different reasons. In 2018 elections, he defeated two heavy weights: former PM Yousuf Raza and former federal Minister Javed Ali Shah. He is known to be a generous, and merciful soul who is very popular in his constituency for helping the poor and confronting corrupt people.

References

Living people
Pakistani MNAs 2018–2023
Pakistan Tehreek-e-Insaf politicians
Year of birth missing (living people)